The Texel is a Dutch breed of domestic sheep originally from the island of Texel. It is a heavy and muscular sheep, and produces a lean meat carcass. It is polled, clean-faced and clean-legged, with white face and wool.

The Texel is distributed in approximately thirty-five countries in Europe, the Americas and Oceania, with estimated populations of over 5000 head in Argentina, Brazil, Chile, the Czech Republic and the United Kingdom.

History
The Texel sheep originated on the island of Texel, the largest of the Wadden Islands off the north coast of the Netherlands. The exact origin of the breed is unknown although it is thought to be a cross of the original Texel sheep with multiple English breeds. It was slowly bred into a meat breed of outstanding carcass quality. It is now one of the most common meat breeds in the Netherlands, making up seventy percent of the national flock.

United Kingdom 
In the early 1970s, the superior quality of the Dutch Texel caught the attention of some English breeders who were interested in importing Dutch Texels to the UK. They were unable to import the Dutch Texels at the time and instead opted for importing French ones due to import laws. At the end of the decade UK import laws changed and allowed the import of Dutch Texels.

What is now known as the British Texel has proven to be a huge success in the British Isles, with many stud rams being used in commercial flocks for the production of meat. The breed has shown that its hardy nature and ability to finish for slaughter in a competitive period of time has been well suited to the requirements of the British food market. These qualities have helped the Texel breed become the most popular terminal sire breed in the UK.

In August 2009, a Texel tup lamb named Deveronvale Perfection was sold for a then world record price for a sheep of £231,000. Bred in Banffshire, Scotland, the lamb was sold by Graham Morrison of Cornhill, Aberdeenshire to fellow sheep farmer Jimmy Douglas at a sale in Lanark. The high price has been attributed to the lamb's strong physical attributes, and Deveronvale Perfection will be used for breeding.

On 28 August 2020 a new world record of  £368,000 was set after a six-month-old Texel ram was sold in Lanark during the Scottish National Texel Sale.

Australia and New Zealand
Texels were selected from Denmark and Finland to suit New Zealand and Australian conditions. In addition to their natural attributes of heavy muscling and leanness, they had to be mobile sheep capable of travelling distances, free lambing and easy care. A select Australian flock began quarantine in New Zealand in 1988 and an objective genetic selection program was implemented.

In Australia, the first Texels were born in September 1993, and the first volume of the Annual Flock Register was produced in April 1994.

In February 2012, selectors (appointed by the Australian Texel Stud Breeders Association Inc.) chose a total of 790 Texel ewes and 50 Texel rams, from a base flock of 2220 Texels available for import to Australia. The Australian Texel Corporation Pty. Ltd. (ATC) was formed by a group of investor-breeders who imported the sheep to Australia and undertook all the embryo transplants and semen collections and was responsible for the release of foetuses via recipient ewes to Australian studmasters.

Peru
In 1951, Texel sheep breeder and exporter Herman J. Keijser of Den Burg exported 100 Texel ewes and rams to Peru on the cargo ship Baarn, where their stocks were used for both meat and wool.

Characteristics 
The Texel breed is a white-faced breed with no wool on the head or legs. The breed is characterized by a distinctive short, wide face with a black nose and widely placed, short ears with a nearly horizontal carriage. They have black hooves. The wool is of medium grade (46-56 microns) with no black fibres.

The most outstanding characteristic of the Texel is its remarkable muscle development and leanness. Texel-sired lambs show an advantage of one full leg score in breed comparisons and less total carcass fat—especially seam fat.

A mutation in the 3' UTR of the myostatin gene in Texel sheep creates target sites for the microRNAs miR-1 and miR-206. This is likely to be the genetic cause of the muscular phenotype of this breed of sheep.

See also

 Beltex
 Blue Texel

References

External links

 AustralianTexel Stud Breeders Association
 British Texel Sheep Society
 Blue Texel Sheep Society 2016 Flockbook

Sheep breeds
Sheep breeds originating in the Netherlands